Edward Arthur Thomas (July 17, 1950 – June 24, 2009) was an American high school football coach. On June 24, 2009, Thomas was shot and killed in his Parkersburg, Iowa football team's weight room by Mark Becker, one of Thomas' former players. Thomas was airlifted to a Waterloo, Iowa hospital where he was pronounced dead shortly after arrival.

Early life
Ed Thomas was born to Authrine and Roy Thomas in 1950. He was born in Oskaloosa, Iowa and raised in What Cheer, Iowa. He played football; his position was quarterback. Thomas was the oldest of 5, having 3 younger sisters and one younger brother. He graduated from Tri-County High School in Thornburg, Iowa in 1968 and obtained degrees from William Penn College and the University of Northern Iowa.

Career
Thomas coached for 37 years in the "IAHSAA" (Iowa High School Athletic Association) football program; winning two state titles and a total of 292 games.  He is credited with having coached four NFL players, which include Aaron Kampman, Brad Meester, Jared DeVries, and Casey Wiegmann. In 2005, Thomas won the prestigious NFL High School Coach of the Year award. Landon Schrage was signed in 2006 as a long snapper for the Baltimore Ravens, making him the 5th player under Coach Thomas to reach the NFL.

Death
Ed Thomas was murdered on June 24, 2009, by Mark Becker, a mentally ill former player who had been released from a Waterloo Hospital less than 24 hours prior to the shooting. Thomas was in a room with 20 football and volleyball players, many of whom testified at the trial of Mark Becker. Ed Thomas was shot 6 or 7 times according to the medical examiner. He also suffered blunt force injuries to his head, chest and legs, which were caused by being stomped on after being shot.

Aftermath
The night of his death, 2,500 mourners gathered for a candlelight vigil. He was featured on the July 6, 2009 cover of Sports Illustrated. On August 28, 2009, the national cable network, ESPN, televised his high school's first football game of the year in memory of Coach Thomas.

On March 2, 2010, a Butler County jury convicted Becker of first-degree murder in connection with Thomas' death. Following a trial that had started February 12 in Allison, the jury received the case on Wednesday, February 24; the jury had reached two stalemates prior to arriving at their verdict. Testimony in the trial focused on Becker's mental state at the time of the shooting. On April 14, 2010, Becker received a life sentence for his conviction of first-degree murder.

Members of Thomas' family have approached the Iowa Legislature to consider legislation requiring hospital personnel to notify law enforcement before releasing a psychiatric patient facing criminal charges. On March 24, 2010, the Ed Thomas Bill was passed.

Thomas was posthumously awarded the Arthur Ashe Courage Award at the 2010 ESPY Awards. On August 16, 2011, Zondervan released The Sacred Acre: The Ed Thomas Story, a book authored by the Thomas family and Mark Tabb; that tells the story of Thomas' role in the town's recovery after the 2008 tornado, and the details of his murder.

References

1950 births
2009 deaths
High school football coaches in Iowa
Male murder victims
Deaths by firearm in Iowa
People murdered in Iowa
University of Northern Iowa alumni
William Penn University alumni